Ruhi, also spelt Rouhi ( rūḥī, rūḥiy, rūḥy) is an Arabic masculine given name in the possessive form which means "spiritual, soulful". It may refer to:

People
 Ruhi al-Khatib, Palestinian politician
 Ruhi Sarıalp, Turkish track and field athlete
 Ruhi Su, Turkish singer 
 Mustaque Ahmed Ruhi, Bangladeshi politician

Education
Ruhi Institute, an educational institution, operating under the guidance of the National Spiritual Assembly of the Bahá'í Faith in Colombia

See also

Arabic masculine given names
Turkish masculine given names